Job strain is a form of psychosocial stress that occurs in the workplace. One of the most common forms of stress, it is characterized by a combination of low salaries, high demands, and low levels of control over things such as raises and paid time off. Stresses at work can be eustress,  a positive type of stress, or distress, a negative type of stress. Job strain in the workplace has proved to result in poor psychological health, and eventually physical health. Job strain has been a recurring issue for years and affects men and women differently.

Causes of work stress

Eustress causes
Examples of positive causes of stress in the workplace include starting a new job and receiving a raise. Both of these situations improve performance.

Distress causes
On the negative side, one cause of job strain is low salaries. Low pay causes job strain due to living expenses.  Housing expenses are extremely high, which makes it difficult for minimum wage workers to afford housing.  As the minimum wage increases, the cost of living increases as well.

The second cause of job strain comes from excessive workloads. Being exhausted from overworking is a common stressor in the workplace and can often lead to poor communication between coworkers.

A lack of support from employers and employees may also cause stress. Making decisions and participating is a way of support from employers and employees.

Health effects
When experiencing job strain in the form of distress at work, people are subject to headaches, stomachaches, sleep disturbances, short temper, and difficulty concentrating. Anxiety, insomnia, high blood pressure, a weakened immune system, and heart disease may occur if stress at work becomes more persistent. A 2012 meta-analysis found a positive association between job strain and coronary heart disease risk. A 2015 meta-analysis found a similar association between job strain and stroke; the association was especially strong for women. Job strain has been found to increase the risk of higher blood pressure, but not obesity.

Gender differences
Men and women react differently when exposed to work situations involving stress. A survey was taken by Canadian Community Health in 2012 that showed women experience higher job strain than men. It also showed that women feel they have lower levels of control, yet experience more coworker support, than men. Because women have lower levels of control at work, they experience more mental health risks such as depression and anxiety. Men tend to suffer from physical risks such as heart disease from carrying higher roles at work.

See also
 Karoshi
 Labor rights
 Occupational burnout
 Occupational stress
 Paid time off
 Right to rest and leisure
 Work–life interface

References

Occupational stress